The West Virginia Miners are a collegiate summer baseball team located in Beckley, West Virginia. The team began play in the Prospect League for the 2010 season.  Home games are played at Linda K. Epling Stadium at the Upper Deck Training Center.

Seasons

Roster

References

External links 
West Virginia Miners

Amateur baseball teams in West Virginia
Prospect League teams
Raleigh County, West Virginia
2010 establishments in West Virginia
Baseball teams established in 2010